Mittie Lawrence (born September 1, 1941) is an American actress and model. The winner of the 1959 Miss Bronze California beauty pageant, she was best known for appearance as a "billboard girl" on Steve Allen's television variety show and from her performances as Fanny Brice's personal assistant and confidant in the 1968 musical Funny Girl and as the politicized nurse in the 1972 drama Night Call Nurses.

References

External links

1941 births
Living people
African-American actresses
African-American female models
American female models
Place of birth missing (living people)
20th-century American actresses
20th-century African-American women
20th-century African-American people
21st-century African-American people
21st-century African-American women